The Lost Songs of St Kilda is an album by James MacMillan and Trevor Morrison, released in 2016 by Decca Records. The album contains modern recordings of traditional songs taught to Morrison as a boy by a resident of St Kilda, Scotland. Alongside MacMillan, the album features arrangements by Craig Armstrong, C Duncan, Rebecca Dale and Francis MacDonald. The album reached the top of the classical music chart and became the fastest selling posthumously released debut album in chart history.

Track listing
Trevor Morrison – "Hirta"
Trevor Morrison – "Soay"
Trevor Morrison – "Boreray"
Trevor Morrison – "Dun"
Trevor Morrison – "Stac An Armin"
Trevor Morrison – "Stac Lee"
Trevor Morrison – "Levenish"
Trevor Morrison – "Stac Dona"
James MacMillan and the Scottish Festival Orchestra – "Soay" (arranged by Rebecca Dale)
James MacMillan and the Scottish Festival Orchestra – "Stac Lee — Dawn" (arranged by Craig Armstrong)
James MacMillan and the Scottish Festival Orchestra – "Stac Lee — Dusk" (arranged by Craig Armstrong)	
James MacMillan and the Scottish Festival Orchestra – "Stac Dona" (arranged by Christopher Duncan)
James MacMillan and the Scottish Festival Orchestra – "Dun" (arranged by Francis Macdonald, vocals by Julie Fowlis)
James MacMillan and the Scottish Festival Orchestra Featuring Trevor Morrison – "Hirta" (arranged by James MacMillan)

References

2016 albums
Decca Records albums
James MacMillan albums